Deir al-Balah Camp is a Palestinian refugee camp in the Deir al-Balah Governorate of the southern Gaza Strip, located one kilometer northwest of the center of Deir al-Balah city, of which it practically forms part. The camp consists of concrete buildings and has eight schools, sewers, and other municipal services. According to the Palestinian Central Bureau of Statistics, the camp had a population of 12,004 in mid-year 2006. It is the smallest refugee camp in the Gaza Strip. Deir al-Balah Camp is built on an area of 0.16 square kilometers (16 hectares;). As of March 2005, the population registered with the United Nations Relief and Works Agency (UNRWA) was 19,534 persons.

History
Originally, the camp housed 9,000 refugees in tents and then mud-brick structures, which were replaced with cement block structures in the early 1960s. The current population is about twice that of the original refugee population, most of whom are now dead.

The original residents of the camp, as with most other Palestinian refugees in the Gaza Strip, came from villages and towns in central and southern pre-1948 Palestine.

Before the 2005 implementation of Israel's unilateral disengagement plan, the camp (and town of which it is part) was surrounded by Israeli settlements—Kfar Darom to the north and Gush Katif to the south—and the highly militarized Abul Holi junction that separated the north of Gaza from the south was located on Deir al-Balah's land.

In late 1997, the Palestinian National Authority demolished several buildings in Deir al-Balah Camp in order to extend the main coastal road between the town and the Mediterranean Sea. Several families were given small plots of land and some financial compensation in order to build new homes outside the settlement.

There was no sewage system in the original camp; Palestinian-managed UNRWA constructed one in 1998 with financial assistance from Japan. In the permanent settlement there are eight Palestinian managed UNRWA schools—six elementary and two preparatory—serving about 8,000 students.

Most residents had worked as laborers in Israel before the beginning of the Second Intifada. A minority of residents have also worked as local farm laborers.

Events during Second Intifada
Throughout the Second Intifada, Deir al-Balah Camp was the site of several Israeli military incursions:

In May 2001 a funeral for four-month-old Iman Hejjo, killed by shrapnel during an Israeli attack on Khan Younis settlement, was held in Deir al-Balah Camp and attended by hundreds of mourners. Her father Mohammed, a policeman, told Reuters that "The killing of my baby will remain as a stigma on the face of Israel and the international community."

According to the Palestinian Human Rights Monitoring Group, on 13 February 2002, Palestinian policeman and camp resident, Shadi Mustafah El-Hassanat, was killed along with two other policeman after five Israeli tanks raided the eastern part of Deir al-Balah and fired flechette shells at them while they sought refuge in a small room near their post.

Residents of Deir al-Balah Camp have also been involved in attempted attacks on Israeli settlements. On 22 November 2003, 24-year-old resident of the camp, Muhammad Suleiman Khalil Sarsur, was killed by Israeli security forces while attempting to infiltrate the Netzarim settlement. On 6 October 2004 17-year-old 'Ali Khaled 'Ali al-Jaru and 21-year-old Iyad Fa'iz Yusef Abu al-'Ata, both from Deir al-Balah Camp, were killed by Israeli security forces while attempting to attack the Kfar Darom settlement.

References

External links
Welcome To Dayr al-Balah R.C.
 Gaza Refugee Camp Profiles, UNWRA, 31 March 2006.
Profile of Deir el-Balah camp by UNRWA
Deir El-Balah, articles from UNWRA
Map of Deir al-Balah governorate showing camp's location 

Palestinian refugee camps in the Gaza Strip
Deir al-Balah
Deir al-Balah Governorate